Käthe Pohland is an East German sprint canoeist who competed in the late 1960s. She won a bronze medal in the K-4 500 m event at the 1966 ICF Canoe Sprint World Championships in East Berlin.

References

East German female canoeists
Living people
Year of birth missing (living people)
ICF Canoe Sprint World Championships medalists in kayak